Segun Owobowale (born 17 August 1997) is a Dutch professional footballer who currently plays as a attacking midfielder for AFC.

Club career
Owobowale is a youth exponent from ADO Den Haag. He made his Eredivisie debut on 30 August 2014 in a 3–2 away defeat against SC Cambuur.

On 26 March 2021, he joined third-tier club AFC.

International career
Owobowale was born in the Netherlands to a Nigerian father and a Dutch mother. He is a former youth international for the Netherlands.

References

External links
OnsOranje U17 Profile

Living people
1997 births
Footballers from Leiden
Dutch people of Nigerian descent
Association football midfielders
Dutch footballers
Netherlands youth international footballers
ADO Den Haag players
NEC Nijmegen players
VV Noordwijk players
Amsterdamsche FC players
Eredivisie players
Eerste Divisie players
Derde Divisie players
Tweede Divisie players